James Dominic Francis Briggs (born 1 September 1868) was an Australian-born South African politician and trade unionist.

Born in Parramatta in New South Wales, Briggs moved with his family to Bolton in England when he was ten years old.  There, he completed an apprenticeship as a bricklayer and joined the Manchester Unity of Bricklayers trade union.

In 1890, Briggs emigrated to the United States, where he joined the Bricklayers' and Masons' International Union, working in various locations across the country, and also in Canada.  In 1902, he emigrated again, to Durban in South Africa.  There, he joined the Durban Bricklayers' Society, but soon moved to Pretoria, where he helped found the Operative Bricklayers' Society of South Africa.  For five years, he served as chairman of the union.  He also chaired the Pretoria Trades Council.

Briggs next moved to Benoni, where he founded and chaired a new branch of the union.  He supported its merger into the new Building Workers' Industrial Union, and served for three years as its chairman.  He was the union's delegate to the South African Industrial Federation.  In 1925, it was replaced by the South African Trades Union Council, of which Briggs was elected as president.

Briggs was a founder member of the Labour Party, and served as its chairman for eight years.  In 1925, he was elected to the Senate of South Africa, representing Transvaal, replacing Peter Whiteside.  The party split in two later in the decade, but reunited in 1931, and Briggs was then elected as the party's chairman, serving until the mid-1940s.

References

1868 births
Year of death missing
Australian emigrants to South Africa
Labour Party (South Africa) politicians
People from Parramatta
South African trade union leaders